Gefillde are filled raspeballs from raw and cooked potatoes, which are known as specialities in South-West Germany and Alsace. This dish is one of the most popular dishes in Saarland.

The filling of the raspeball can be pork, beef or liver sausage. Other ingredients can be soaked bread rolls, cut onion, persil and leek. Traditionally the food is served with sauerkraut and a bacon-cream-sauce in a deep plate.

References 

Potato dishes
Palatine cuisine
German cuisine